Harbor Point  is a  shopping mall in Subic Bay Freeport Zone in Olongapo City, Zambales, Philippines owned by property development firm Ayala Land, Inc., a real estate subsidiary of Ayala Corporation. It is the first Ayala mall located in Subic Bay and the second in the Central Luzon region.

The Mall is located across the river (a foot bridge essentially connects the two locations) from its significant market competition, SM City Olongapo, owned by SM Prime Holdings which will become Subic's new Central Business District. The mall was named Harbor Point because of Subic's bayside location.  It was opened on April 26, 2012.

The mall is composed of three major levels.  It also has a Puregold supermarket which serves as the anchor store.

History
Ayala Land signed on October 2009 an agreement with the Subic Bay Metropolitan Authority (SBMA), for the development of a 7.5-hectare property along Rizal Highway within the Subic Bay Freeport Zone, straddling the boundary between the Subic Bay Freeport Zone and Olongapo City near the free port's main gate.  Ayala Land Inc. envisions the development of an integrated mixed-use master-planned community which will include a shopping mall, Business Process Outsourcing office building, and hotel that will rise in the Subic Central Business District. This development is part of the company's strategy to establish mixed-use master-planned growth centers in various parts of the country  More than 400 local and international companies may locate at the Ayala Harbor Point mall.

Gallery

External links
Harbor Point Official website

See also
SM City Olongapo Central
SM City Olongapo Downtown
List of shopping malls in the Philippines

References

Shopping malls in the Philippines
Buildings and structures in Olongapo
Tourist attractions in Zambales
Ayala Malls
Shopping malls established in 2012